Alex Lambacher (born October 7, 1996) is an Italian professional ice hockey forward who is currently under contract with the Heilbronner Falken of the DEL2. He has played internationally with the Italian national team.

Playing career
After playing a junior season in the North American Hockey League, Lambacher agreed to a two-year contract with German club, Adler Mannheim of the DEL, on July 22, 2016.

Lambacher played just 5 games through his contract with Mannheim, featuring primarily in the DEL2. On June 6, 2019, he signed as a free agent to a one-year contract with Augsburger Panther.

International play
He participated at the 2017 IIHF World Championship for Italy.

References

External links

1996 births
Living people
Adler Mannheim players
Augsburger Panther players
Italian ice hockey forwards
Sportspeople from Brixen
Italian expatriate ice hockey people
Germanophone Italian people
Hannover Indians players
Heilbronner Falken players
Italian expatriate sportspeople in Germany
Kassel Huskies players